The Parliament of Chechen Republic of Ichkeria was the legislative body of Chechen Republic of Ichkeria. The last elections for the 63 seats took place in 1997. The Parliament has been in exile since the Second Chechen War.

Speakers

Parliamentary elections in Chechen Republic of Ichkeria, 1997
The elections were held at 27 January and 15 February 1997.

References

Chechnya
Politics of Chechnya
Chechen Republic of Ichkeria
Chechnya
Chechnya